Vinyl is an EP by alternative rock group Dramarama. It was released in 1992.

Track listing
 "I've Got Spies" — 4:20
 "On the Streets" — 3:06
 "Come (To Meet Me)" — 4:12
 "Tie Me Down 	Easdale" — 3:17
 "Convenience Store" — 2:29

References 
Vinyl (EP) - Dramarama

1992 EPs
Dramarama albums